Dafydd Iwan Jones (born 24 August 1943) is a Welsh singer and nationalist politician who rose to fame writing and performing folk music in the Welsh language. From 2003 to 2010, Iwan was the president of Plaid Cymru, a political party which advocates for Welsh independence from the UK.

Early life
Dafydd Iwan Jones was born in Brynamman, Carmarthenshire. One of four boys, his siblings include the actor Huw Ceredig and the politician Alun Ffred Jones. His paternal grandfather, Fred Jones, was a member of the Bardic family Teulu'r Cilie, and a founding member of Plaid Cymru. He spent most of his youth in Bala in Gwynedd before attending the University of Wales, Cardiff, where he studied architecture.

Musical career
Iwan's earliest material was Welsh translations of songs by American folk/protest singers (Woody Guthrie, Pete Seeger, and Bob Dylan) until he began to write his first ballads. The most prominent of these were political, including the satirical song, "Carlo" ("Charles"). This was written for the investiture of the Prince of Wales in 1969. Iwan has also written love ballads and variations on traditional Welsh folk tunes.

By the late 1960s, he was receiving television coverage both for his music and for his political activities as a member of Cymdeithas yr Iaith. He was imprisoned in 1970 for his refusal to pay fines for defacing English-language road signs as part of the fight for Welsh-language rights, serving three weeks of a three-month sentence. This event was commemorated in his song "Pam fod eira'n wyn?" ("Why is snow white?"). His song "Peintio'r byd yn wyrdd" ("Painting the World Green") was regarded as a "battle hymn" of the road signs campaign.

During the 1970s, his political interests (and songs) took in such themes as Pinochet's Chile, Welsh devolution, the Vietnam War and the Northern Ireland troubles. Later songs mention events such as the Tiananmen Square massacre (1989), the Gulf War (1990) and opencast mining in the south Wales valleys (1995). 

In 1982 and 1983, Iwan embarked on two tours (and accompanying records) with the folk group Ar Log.

Around the turn of the millennium, he signalled an end to regular performances, although he remains an occasional performer.

Yma o Hyd 
"Yma O Hyd" ("Still Here") was released in 1981 to “raise the spirits, to remind people we still speak Welsh against all odds. To show we are still here". Since then, the song has become an unofficial Welsh anthem as well as an unofficial anthem for the Wales national football team. 

In January 2020, Iwan's song "Yma o Hyd" ("Still Here") reached number one in the UK iTunes chart, spurred on by purchases by supporters of Welsh independence group YesCymru. The campaign mirrored the success of the Wolfe Tones song "Come Out, Ye Black and Tans" earlier that month. 

The song was also sung live by Dafydd Iwan before Wales' last two games of their first successful FIFA World Cup qualification since 1958. Gareth Bale, the Welsh captain also led the Welsh team singing along with Dafydd Iwan after the final match. The performance and Wales's qualification led to the song returning to number one in the UK iTunes chart.

Public life

Formerly a Plaid Cymru councillor in Gwynedd, he lost his seat in the May 2008 local elections. He blamed his defeat on a dirty tricks campaign by his opponents.

Iwan's long service to the Welsh language led to his being made an honorary member of the Gorsedd of Bards at the National Eisteddfod at Bangor in 1971.

Iwan escaped a driving ban (for speeding offences) in October 2003 on the basis that he needed to drive for his musical and political duties.

Iwan became President of Plaid Cymru in 2003.

As part of his campaign seeking re-election as President of Plaid Cymru, Iwan launched a campaign blog Dafydd 4 President in July 2008.

On 22 October 2011, Dafydd and his wife Bethan came to watch the Welsh derby, Wrexham F.C. vs Newport County A.F.C. Dafydd sang his hit song "Yma O Hyd" in front of a crowd of 4,000 before the teams came out. He was invited to sing by the new Wrexham FC Supporters Group, who chose their name "Yma O Hyd" after his song.

Albums

 Yma Mae 'Nghân (1972) (Here's My Song)
 Mae'r Darnau yn Disgyn i'w Lle (1976) (The Pieces Fall into Place)
 Carlo a Chaneuon Eraill (1977) (Carlo and Other Songs)
 20 o Ganeuon Gorau (20 best songs)
 I'r Gad (1977) (To The War)
 Bod yn Rhydd (1979) (Being Free)
 Ar Dan (Live) (1981)
 Rhwng Hwyl a Thaith (with Ar Log) (1982) (Between Fun and Tour)
 Yma o Hyd (With Ar Log) (1983) (Still Here)
 Gwinllan a Roddwyd (1986) (Donated Vineyard)
 Dal I Gredu (1991) (Still Believe)
 Caneuon Gwerin (1994) (Folk Songs)
 Cân Celt (1995) (Celt Song)
 Y Caneuon Cynnar (1998) (Early Songs)
 Yn Fyw Cyfrol 1 (2001) (Live Volume 1)
 Yn Fyw Cyfrol 2 (2002) (Live Volume 2)
 Goreuon Dafydd Iwan (2006) (Best of Dafydd Iwan)
 Man Gwyn (White Space) (song about the early Welsh emigration to Patagonia and North America) (2007)
 Dos I ganu (2009) (Go To Sing)
 Cana Dy Gân (2012) (Sing Your Song) (complete 212 song collection)
 Emynau (2015) (Hymns)
 O’r Galon (2018) (From the Heart)

References

Further reading

 E. Wyn James, 'Painting the World Green: Dafydd Iwan and the Welsh Protest Ballad', Folk Music Journal, 8:5 (2005), pp. 594-618. Also available electronically: https://www.cardiff.ac.uk/special-collections/subject-guides/welsh-ballads/dafydd-iwan
 E. Wyn James, 'Dafydd Iwan, Wales and the World': https://www.youtube.com/watch?v=ZZt8rXtFCj0&t=4s
 C. Fowler, 'Representations of nationalism in the music of Dafydd Iwan', 'Folklore and Identity' Celtic Folk Studies Conference, Cardiff University School of Welsh, 22 July 2005.
 Llion Iwan (ed.), 'Dafydd Iwan : bywyd mewn lluniau : a life in pictures'. Llandysul, Ceredigion, Cymru : Gomer Press, 2005. . (Welsh and English)
 Cymraeg – a startling revival, Dafydd Iwan and Arfon Gwilym interviewed by Rob Gibson, in Burnett, Ray (ed.), Calgacus'' 3, Spring 1976, pp. 18 – 21,

External links
 Dafydd Iwan's website
 100 Welsh Heroes
 Sain biography
 Dafydd 4 President, Campaign Blog

1943 births
Leaders of Plaid Cymru
Living people
Singers from Carmarthenshire
Welsh folk musicians
Welsh-language singers
Welsh singer-songwriters
Welsh language activists
Welsh-speaking politicians
Councillors in Wales
Alumni of the Welsh School of Architecture
People from Brynamman
Welsh republicans